Devil's Food is a singles compilation by American rock and roll band Supersuckers. It was released in April 2005 on Mid-Fi records.

Track listing
"Gato Negro"
"Shake It Off"
"Hey Ya"
"Teenage Shutdown" 
"Doublewide" (country version)
"Team Man"	
"Can Pipe"
"Rubber Biscuit"
"Born with a Tail" (country version) 	
"Devil's Food"
"Sail On"
"Kid's Got It Comin'"
"Eastbound & Down"
"Then I'm Gone"
"Flyin' Into the Mid-Day Sun"
"End of an Era"

Notes
"Gato Negro" originally appeared on a split single with the band Zeke.
"Hey Ya" is a cover of the song by OutKast.
"Teenage Shutdown" is a cover of the song by Electric Frankenstein, originally appearing on Splitsville 1.
"Rubber Biscuit" is a cover of the song by The Chips.
"Sail On" is a cover of the song by The Commodores.
"Eastbound & Down" is a cover of the Jerry Reed song "East Bound and Down" originally written for the movie Smokey and the Bandit.
"Doublewide" and "Born With a Tail" are country versions of songs originally appearing on the band's 1995 Sub Pop album, The Sacrilicious Sounds of the Supersuckers.

References

Supersuckers albums
2005 compilation albums